Anja Nielsen (born 12 April 1975) is a former Danish team handball player and Olympic champion. She won a gold medal with the Danish national team at the 2000 Summer Olympics in Sydney.

References

External links

1975 births
Living people
Danish female handball players
Olympic gold medalists for Denmark
Handball players at the 2000 Summer Olympics
Olympic medalists in handball
Medalists at the 2000 Summer Olympics